Sımada is a village and municipality in the Saatly Rayon of Azerbaijan.  It has a population of 1,372.

References 

Populated places in Saatly District